Atuna penangiana is a species of plant in the family Chrysobalanaceae. It is a tree endemic to Peninsular Malaysia. It is threatened by habitat loss.

References

penangiana
Endemic flora of Peninsular Malaysia
Trees of Peninsular Malaysia
Vulnerable plants
Taxonomy articles created by Polbot